Dyspessa pallidata is a species of moth of the family Cossidae. It is found in Transcaucasia, the Caucasus, Turkey, Iran, Jordan, Israel and northern Egypt.

Adults have been recorded on wing from May to September in Israel.

The larvae probably feed on Allium species.

References

Moths described in 1892
Dyspessa
Moths of Asia
Moths of Europe
Moths of Africa